Lanark—Frontenac—Lennox and Addington was a provincial electoral district in Ontario, Canada, which was represented in the Legislative Assembly of Ontario from 2007 to 2018.  The new riding was created in 2003 from parts of Hastings—Frontenac—Lennox and Addington and Lanark—Carleton ridings.

In the 2007 provincial election, the MPPs representing the two predecessor ridings of Hastings—Frontenac—Lennox and Addington and Lanark—Carleton chose to run, respectively, in the newly created ridings of Prince Edward—Hastings to the west of the new riding, and Carleton—Mississippi Mills to its east. As a result, the riding had no incumbent, and was contested by candidates who had never previously held office. Progressive Conservative Party of Ontario (PC) candidate Randy Hillier won by a narrow margin of less than one thousand votes, one of only three victories for a PC candidate in a non-incumbent-held riding.

Hillier would go on to win two additional victories in Lanark-Frontenac-Lennox and Addington; he was the only MPP to represent the district during its eleven-year existence.

The district was abolished at the time of the 2018 general election; the Lanark County and Frontenac components of the riding were redistributed to the new district of Lanark—Frontenac—Kingston, while Lennox and Addington County was redistributed to the new district of  Hastings—Lennox and Addington.

Members of Provincial Parliament

Election results

2007 electoral reform referendum

References

Elections Ontario Past Election Results
 Elections Ontario constituency profile

http://www.cbc.ca/news/canada/ontariovotes2011/#/41

External links
 Constituency website of MPP Randy Hillier

Former provincial electoral districts of Ontario
Carleton Place